Aegina citrea is a genus of hydrozoans in the family Aeginidae.

Species
There are two recognized species in the genus Aegina:

References

Hydrozoan genera
Bioluminescent cnidarians
Aeginidae